Gulidjan (Coligan, Kolijon, Kolitjon), also known as Kolakngat (Kolacgnat, Colac),  is an extinct Aboriginal Australian language of the Gulidjan people of the state of Victoria, Australia. There is very limited data available on the language, but linguists have suggested that it is a mixed language, containing elements of neighbouring languages.

Attestation 

The language is first attested in 1839. Though much of the detail and vocabulary has been lost, there is sufficient to confirm that it constituted a separate language. About 100 words have survived. Some analysis suggests it may be a mixed language or creole language having something in common with each of the neighbouring languages. Earliest sources refer to the language as Gulidjan, although James Dawson favoured Kolakgnat, which means 'belonging to sand'. No speakers have been recorded since 1975, so it is considered an extinct language.

References

Kulinic languages
Extinct languages of Victoria (Australia)